Sopheon Corporation is a global enterprise software and services company focused on delivering InnovationOps. It is headquartered in the United States, with offices in Denver and Minneapolis; the company also has operating units in the United Kingdom, the Netherlands and Germany. 

Sopheon empowers organizations to change the world while achieving exceptional long-term revenue growth and profitability. By operationalizing the entire innovation life cycle, Accolade® and Acclaim™ software and expertise enable innovation, product, and project professionals to accomplish the full range of InnovationOps tasks to drive innovation at scale. Sopheon’s industry leadership was highlighted in the comprehensive MarketsandMarkets™ report on the Innovation Management market, in which Sopheon was listed in the “Stars” category, the highest recognition. Sopheon’s solutions have been implemented by hundreds of blue-chip customers with over 125,000 users in 50 countries. 

Sopheon is listed on the Alternative Investment Market of the London Stock Exchange.

In December 2021, the company acquired ROI Blueprints, an enterprise planning and execution solutions provider. It is now branded Acclaim Projects. 

In May 2022, Sopheon acquired Solverboard, a UK-based cloud business that is now branded Acclaim Ideas for idea management.  

In September 2022, Sopheon introduced Acclaim Products for product people to track product health, prioritize trade-offs, inform stakeholders, and make decisions without having to spend hours cobbling information together.

References

External links
 

Software companies of the Netherlands
Software companies based in Minnesota
Software companies of the United States